Ricardo Rimini (28 January 1908 – 1972) was a Uruguayan fencer. He competed in the individual foil event at the 1952 Summer Olympics. He finished second in the 1955 Pan American Games sabre team competition (with Teodoro Goliardi, Juan Paladino, and the non-Olympian José Lardizábal).

References

External links
 

1908 births
1972 deaths
Fencers from Rome
Italian emigrants to Uruguay
Uruguayan male foil fencers
Olympic fencers of Uruguay
Fencers at the 1952 Summer Olympics
Pan American Games silver medalists for Uruguay
Fencers at the 1955 Pan American Games
Pan American Games medalists in fencing
Uruguayan male sabre fencers
Medalists at the 1955 Pan American Games